Yoann-Jean-Noël Langlet (born 25 December 1982) is a footballer who plays as a midfielder. Born in Réunion, an overseas department and region of France in the Indian Ocean, he represented the Mauritania national team internationally.

Club career
Langlet has played for clubs in France, Switzerland, Libya and Greece.

International career
In 2003, Langlet agreed to become a naturalized citizen of Mauritania, following an invitation by fellow Frenchman Noel Tosi, who was then the Mauritania national team and wanted him in the squad.

International goals
Scores and results list Mauritania's goal tally first.

References

http://www.football.ch/sfl/de/start.aspx?vNews=1&newsID=4

External links

1982 births
Living people
Footballers from Réunion
French footballers
Association football midfielders
FC Girondins de Bordeaux players
Stade Lavallois players
FC Sion players
FC Vaduz players
Al-Ittihad Club (Tripoli) players
FC Stade Nyonnais players
Ionikos F.C. players
Thrasyvoulos F.C. players
Enosis Neon Paralimni FC players
Football League (Greece) players
Cypriot First Division players
Swiss Challenge League players
FC Fribourg players
Libyan Premier League players
FC Monthey players
FC Vevey United players
French expatriate footballers
French expatriate sportspeople in Cyprus
Expatriate footballers in Cyprus
French expatriates in Libya
Expatriate footballers in Libya
French expatriate sportspeople in Switzerland
Expatriate footballers in Switzerland
French expatriate sportspeople in Greece
Expatriate footballers in Greece
French expatriate sportspeople in Liechtenstein
Expatriate footballers in Liechtenstein
French people of Réunionnais descent
French sportspeople of Mauritanian descent
Naturalized citizens of Mauritania
Mauritania international footballers
Mauritanian footballers
Black French sportspeople